George Williams (November 11, 1859 or 1860 in Kewanee, Illinois – December 22, 1929 in Coeur d'Alene, Idaho) was an American architect based in Coeur d'Alene, Idaho. He was born in Illinois and moved to Coeur D'Alene in 1903.

A number of his works are listed on the National Register of Historic Places.

Works include:
 Roosevelt School, Coeur d'Alene, Idaho (1905, NRHP 1976)
 First United Methodist Church, Coeur d'Alene, Idaho (1906, NRHP 1979)
 Coeur d'Alene City Hall, Coeur d'Alene, Idaho (1908, NRHP 1979)
 Coeur d'Alene Masonic Temple, Coeur d'Alene, Idaho (1909-11, NRHP 1978)

References

Architects from Idaho
20th-century American architects
People from Coeur d'Alene, Idaho
1860 births
1929 deaths